Richard L. Gabriel (born March 3, 1962) is an American lawyer and judge, who is an associate justice of the Colorado Supreme Court. He previously served on the Colorado Court of Appeals from 2008 to 2015.

Education and early career
Gabriel was born in Brooklyn, New York City, in 1962, and was one of seven children. He completed a Bachelor of Arts degree in American studies in 1984 at Yale University, and completed a J.D. degree in 1987 at the University of Pennsylvania Law School, where he was articles editor for the University of Pennsylvania Law Review in 1986-87.

Gabriel clerked for federal judge J. Frederick Motz of the United States District Court for the District of Maryland in 1987-88. He worked in private practice in New York City from 1988 to 1990. Gabriel moved to Colorado in 1990, because of a job offered to his wife, and was an associate and then a partner at a law firm in Denver from 1994 to 2008. Gabriel's wife, Jill Wichlens, is an attorney with the Federal public defender's office in Denver.

Gabriel specialized in business law, including commercial litigation and intellectual property law. He also served as city prosecutor for Lafayette, Colorado for several years. In 2007, Gabriel was named the Intellectual Property Lawyer of the Year by Law Week Colorado.

Judicial service
The Governor of Colorado Bill Ritter announced in May 2008 that Gabriel would be appointed to the Colorado Court of Appeals, and he was sworn in as a judge on June 30. He was retained in a retention election in November 2010, winning 65.9 per cent of the vote.

In March 2015, Colorado Supreme Court justice Gregory J. Hobbs Jr. announced that he would retire effective from September 1, 2015. The Colorado Judicial Nominating Commission selected Gabriel as one of three possible candidates to replace Hobbs. The other two candidates were University of Colorado Law School professor Melissa Hart and district court judge David Prince of the 4th Judicial District. Governor John Hickenlooper announced Gabriel as his choice to replace Hobbs on June 23, 2015.

In May 2017, Justice Gabriel concurred in judgment when finding that imposing an eighty-four year sentence on a fifteen-year-old murderer did not violate the Constitution’s Eighth Amendment prohibition on sentencing juveniles to life without parole because the child might live through the end of his sentence.

Gabriel was retained by voters in a 2018 retention election.

References

1962 births
Living people
Justices of the Colorado Supreme Court
Yale College alumni
University of Pennsylvania Law School alumni
People from Brooklyn
21st-century American judges
Colorado Court of Appeals judges